Khairulla Abdrakhmanovich Usmanov (December 16, 1866, Orenburg Governorate — June 14, 1915, Orenburg) was a mullah and deputy of the Second Imperial Duma from the Orenburg Governorate in 1907.

Literature 
 Петров Егор Алексеевич (in Russian) // Государственная дума Российской империи: 1906—1917 / Б. Ю. Иванов, А. А. Комзолова, И. С. Ряховская. — Москва: РОССПЭН, 2008. — P. 640. — 735 p. — .
 Члены Государственной Думы (портреты и биографии). Второй созыв. 1907—1912 гг. / Сост. М. М. Боиович. — Москва, 1907. — P. 217. (in Russian)

1866 births
1915 deaths
People from Orenburg Governorate
Russian Constitutional Democratic Party members
Members of the 2nd State Duma of the Russian Empire